Georgian Civil Aviation Administration (საქართველოს სამოქალაქო ავიაციის ადმინისტრაციის) is the Aviation Authority which controls all the aviation affairs on the territory of Georgia. GCCA HQ is at Tbilisi International Airport in the city of Tbilisi (Coordinates : 41°40'09N 044°57'17E).

GCAA complies with the ICAO (International Civil Aviation Organization) HQ in Montreal, Quebec, CANADA.

Air Transportation

Air Transportation Functions of Air Transportation Department:
Facilitating  Georgian air carriers in International aviation market access;
Granting Georgian aviation market access  to foreign air carriers;
Issuing permissions for non-scheduled flights to Georgian and  foreign  air carriers;
Granting of permissions for the aerial works in the territory of Georgia;
Approval of airlines flight schedules in accordance with IATA navigation seasons;
Certification of air cargo terminals;
Surveillance on shipment of dangerous goods by the civil aircraft and lifting up restrictions for carriage of above-mentioned cargo by the same transport.

Aerodromes and Airports

The main responsibilities of Aerodromes and Airports Department:
Certification of Civil Aerodromes and Heliports;
Keeping State Registers of Civil Aerodromes and Heliports;
Performing technical regulation of certified civil aerodromes and heliports, carrying out control over its compliance with International civil aviation standards and continuing surveillance, as well as inspection of their activities, as to ensure flight safety;
Keeping records and controlling the obstacles at aerodromes and on its close vicinity, as well as in the aircraft's’ flight and manoeuvring zones;
Keeping records over the domestic flying grounds and conducting there technical supervision;
Certification of aviation fuel suppliers;
Keeping Registers of aviation fuel suppliers;
Performing technical supervision and inspection of aviation fuel suppliers.

Air Navigation Service Department

The main responsibilities of ANS Department:
Conducting certification and supervision of Air Navigation Service Providers;
Approving and monitoring of technical facilities and devices, relevant for the providing  Air Traffic Management (ATM), Communication, navigation and surveillance (CNS) services  as well as Aeronautical Information Service (AIS);
Carrying out the surveillance on Aeronautical Meteorological Service maintenance;
Organizing search and rescue activities in the Civil Aviation field and ensuring coordination with appropriate government authorities.

This is a list of airlines currently operating in Georgia under Georgian Civil Aviation Administration (GCCA).

References

 Georgian Civil Aviation Administration official website. 
 Contacts to the key people of Georgian Civil Aviation Administration.
 List of member states of the ICAO.
 International arrivals and departures at Tbilisi Intl' Airport.
 Domestic arrivals and departures at Tbilisi Intl' Airport.
 Cargo flight schedule at Tbilisi Intl' Airport.
 Flight Information Region In Georgia

International Civil Aviation Organization
Aviation in Georgia (country)